The Second Stafford Ministry was the eighth responsible government to be formed in New Zealand, and one of the longer-lasting ministries during this period. It formed in October 1865 and lasted until June 1869. However, it was defeated in a vote of confidence on 15 August 1866 and resigned, to be reconstituted with three ministers replaced, so some contemporaries regarded it as two separate Ministries. As the office of Premier had yet to be formally established, Edward Stafford did not carry this title officially.

Background
The previous Weld ministry collapsed due to a confidence motion brought by Julius Vogel, but Frederick Weld advised Governor Grey to call Edward Stafford instead. Grey promised Stafford to grant him a fresh general election even if the House did not express its confidence in him by granting Supply, raising the ire of the Weldites. The new government had three main policies: peace with Māori, retrenchment of the public accounts, and enhancing the power of central government.

Against the Ministry's proposal to reduce the funding of Provincial governments from customs receipts, the provincialist William Sefton Moorhouse moved a confidence motion which succeeded by 47 votes to 14 in August 1866, but Stafford was re-appointed and formed a coalition with the former Weldites. One of these was John Richardson, who was threatened with rotten eggs next time he visited his ultra-provincialist home of Dunedin. Upon the election of James Macandrew as Superintendent of Otago, Stafford caused a furore by withdrawing his power to manage the goldfields until his previous conduct had been audited.

With regard to finances, the Ministry pledged to make £240,000 in budget savings, and succeeded in returning to a surplus in 1866. They also successfully put a counter-claim to Britain's charges for the expense of providing Imperial regiments during the New Zealand Wars, and their focus on expenditure was described by Postmaster-General John Hall as "retrenchment frenzy". In 1867 the provinces' existing loans were taken over by the central government and the local governments were forbidden from taking out any further loans.

The Māori policy of the Government was of non-intervention unless provoked: Stafford followed a conciliatory line by pardoning some of the killers of Carl Volkner, and attempted to involve Māori in colonial politics by creating four electoral districts in the House of Representatives for them. Later, the outbreak of two new insurgencies led by Tītokowaru and Te Kooti raised a military response. Government Agent and opposition politician Donald McLean was sacked in March 1869 for advising Major Ropata not to obey orders to reinforce the Taranaki campaign, and Opposition leader Sir William Fox moved a no-confidence vote over the dismissal, which he won 40–29 on 24 June.

Ministers
The following members served in the Weld Ministry:

See also
 New Zealand Government

Notes

References

Ministries of Queen Victoria
Governments of New Zealand
19th century in New Zealand
1865 establishments in New Zealand
Cabinets established in 1865
Cabinets disestablished in 1869